Josane Sigart (7 January 1909 – 20 August 1999) was a Belgian tennis player who was active in the 1930s.
In 1928, she won the singles title at the Belgian Championships and would repeat this success in 1929, 1931, 1932, 1936 and 1946.
In 1932, she won the Wimbledon Championships in woman's doubles with the Doris Metaxa and reached the mixed-doubles final with Harry Hopman.

In 1932, she was ranked world No. 10 by A. Wallis Myers.

Grand Slam finals

Doubles: 2 (1 title, 1 runner-up)

Mixed doubles: 1 (1 runner-up)

References

External links
 Josane Sigart - her activity (under her husband's last name, Josiane de Meulemeester) to save Jews' lives during the Holocaust, at Yad Vashem website	

1909 births
1999 deaths
Belgian female tennis players
Sportspeople from Brussels
Wimbledon champions (pre-Open Era)
Grand Slam (tennis) champions in women's doubles
20th-century Belgian women